Blake Mott was the defending champion but lost in the first round to Brydan Klein.

Noah Rubin won the title after defeating Mitchell Krueger 6–0, 6–1 in the final.

Seeds

Draw

Finals

Top half

Bottom half

References
Main Draw
Qualifying Draw

Launceston Tennis International - Men's Singles